The Prayer is a 2018 French drama film directed by Cédric Kahn. It was selected to compete for the Golden Bear in the main competition section at the 68th Berlin International Film Festival. At Berlin, Anthony Bajon won the Silver Bear for Best Actor.

Cast
 Anthony Bajon as Thomas
 Damien Chapelle as Pierre
 Alex Brendemühl as Marco
 Louise Grinberg as Sybille
 Hanna Schygulla as Soeur Myriam
 Davide Campagna as Luciano

References

External links
 
 

2018 films
2018 drama films
French drama films
2010s French-language films
2010s French films